Politehnica may refer to:

Politehnica University of Bucharest
Politehnica University of Timișoara
Politehnica metro station in Bucharest
FC Politehnica Timișoara, a football club